Jeffrey James Weise (August 8, 1988 – March 21, 2005) was an American student at Red Lake Senior High School in Red Lake, Minnesota, who committed the Red Lake shootings on March 21, 2005.

He killed his grandfather and his grandfather's companion before going to the reservation high school, where he murdered seven more people and wounded five others. He died by suicide before he could be captured by the police. Weise struggled in school due to frequent relocations, bullying, disruptions in his personal life and truancy.

In May and June 2004, Weise attempted suicide and was briefly hospitalized. He was under treatment for depression, and had been prescribed Prozac as an anti-depressant. His case revived the public discussion about the use of Prozac for children and adolescents; the Food and Drug Administration had published a warning about it in October 2004 as a factor in increased suicides and violence among youths.

Life 
Weise was born in 1988 in Minneapolis, Minnesota, the only child of Joanne Elizabeth Weise (born April 15, 1970) and Daryl "Baby Dash" Allen Lussier Jr. (November 22, 1965 – July 21, 1997), an unmarried Ojibwe couple from the Red Lake Indian Reservation in Red Lake, Minnesota. The Ojibwe permit only their tribal members to live on the reservation, which is located in northwest Minnesota 250 miles north of Minneapolis; it is one of two "closed" reservations in the country. The couple separated before the boy was born.

In November 1988, Joanne's parents forced her to give up three-month-old Jeff to the care of his father, who lived with his parents and family in Red Lake. In June 1991, when Jeff was nearly three years old, his mother reclaimed the boy. She took him to live in the Minneapolis–Saint Paul area. He later claimed in online postings that his mother was an alcoholic and had physically and emotionally abused him.

In 1992, Joanne Weise began dating a man who allegedly also abused Jeff. After having two children, the couple married on June 27, 1998.

On July 21, 1997, when Jeff was eight, his father died by suicide by shooting himself. He had been in a standoff with the Red Lake Police Department for some days in Red Lake. His grandfather, Daryl "Dash" Lussier Sr. (September 3, 1946 – March 21, 2005), a sergeant in the tribal police force since 1965, had tried to intervene but was unable to bring about a peaceful end.

On March 5, 1999, when Jeff was ten, his mother was in a car accident, in which a tractor-trailer crashed into the car that her cousin was driving. The women had been drinking. The cousin died in the accident and Joanne suffered severe brain damage. In 2000, she and her husband separated; they completed the divorce in May 2004. Their custody arrangements covered only the children they had together and not Jeff.

Following his mother's accident, Jeff was placed in the custody and care of his paternal grandmother, on the Red Lake reservation. The boy had to leave Minneapolis, where he had lived for nearly eleven years. Two of his paternal aunts said they were also involved in his care; one lived with her child at their mother's during this period.

Jeff's grandmother and her husband were separated. He shared a house with his companion and their son. According to the family, Jeff became close to both of his grandparents. By 2003, his mother had moved to an assisted-living facility; she had recovered enough from her accident to work part-time, and had regained speech. Weise chose to stay with his grandmother rather than rejoin his mother and move again.

Schools 
Due to his disrupted family life, Weise attended numerous schools as a boy: Pearson Elementary School in Shakopee, Minnesota, from kindergarten to fourth grade; Bluff Creek Elementary School in Chanhassen, Minnesota, for fifth grade; and Red Lake Middle School for sixth through eighth grades. In 2002, Weise was forced to repeat the eighth grade because of failing grades and truancy; he enrolled in a special education program at the school called the Learning Center. Beginning in middle school, Weise was frequently taunted and bullied by other students.

High school 
Weise became close to his paternal grandfather, Daryl "Dash" Lussier Sr., and his younger companion, Michele Sigana, who had given him his own room with them. The family said Weise had a good relationship with both.

In September 2003, Weise enrolled at Red Lake Senior High School in Red Lake. Teachers and fellow students remembered him as withdrawn, and he reportedly had a history of troublesome behavior. At times he was referred to be homeschooled. His grandmother said he had not been in school for five weeks before the shooting.

His social studies teacher Wanda Baxter recalled, "[Weise] was a good listener like any other ordinary student. He was quiet but never a troublemaker." Another teacher described Weise as "a pretty bright kid, but ... lazy when it came to school."

According to reports, Weise was teased by fellow students because of his physical appearance: he was six feet tall and 250 pounds; he dressed in all-black clothing with a full-length coat. He usually did not respond to their taunts. Weise said, "Because of my size and appearance people don't give me as much trouble as they would if I looked weak." Several students remember Weise as being non-violent. In addition, a family member said that students were aware of the suicide of Weise's father and his mother's being confined to a nursing home while he attended the high school.

A close friend of Weise described him as "the only one I talked to about my problems. He was trustworthy, and he was always capable of understanding what I was going through". Other girls also said they could talk to him. Although Weise was sometimes described as a loner, several students said he had numerous friends. He had a notebook in which he drew what a close friend described as "dark stuff".

Later Weise was found to have posted numerous online comments expressing his frustration with living in Red Lake, and feelings that his life was beyond his control. He described the reservation "as a place where people 'choose alcohol over friendship', where women neglect 'their own flesh and blood' for relationships with men, where he could not escape 'the grave I'm continually digging for myself'".

His depression led him to attempt suicide in May 2004, when he cut his wrist. He changed his mind, deciding "this was not the path", and posted his thoughts on the website Above Top Secret:

I had went through a lot of things in my life that had driven me to a darker path than most choose to take. I split the flesh on my wrist with a box opener, painting the floor of my bedroom with blood I shouldn't have spilt. After sitting there for what seemed like hours (which apparently was only minutes), I had the revelation that this was not the path. It was my dicision  to seek medical treatment, as on the other hand I could have chose to sit there until enough blood drained from my downward lascerations on my wrists to die.

After he attempted suicide again the following month in June 2004, his aunts arranged with the Red Lake Medical Center for him to be hospitalized at a facility away from the reservation. His continuing treatment included counseling and a prescription for Prozac, an anti-depressant.

One source said that his doctor had increased his dosage in 2005 a week before the shooting, to 60 mg a day of Prozac. His grandmother said he had not seen the doctor since February 21. His aunts Shauna and Tammy Lussier were concerned about the increase in his dosage.

Weise's murders and suicide reopened the public debate about Prozac use among children and adolescents. In October 2004, the Food and Drug Administration (FDA) had issued a warning about its use because of its association with more thoughts and acts of suicide and violence. But, it was at the time the only antidepressant approved for use with children.

Shootings 

On March 21, 2005, Weise killed nine people before killing himself in a murder–suicide. With a Ruger MK II that he had acquired up to a year before the shooting, Weise first killed his grandfather, 58-year-old Daryl Lussier Sr., while he was asleep in bed, and his grandfather's girlfriend, 32-year-old Michelle Sigana, while she was coming back upstairs from the basement with laundry. He then took his grandfather's police-issued firearms and drove his grandfather's police cruiser to the school. At the school, Weise shot and killed unarmed security guard Derrick Brun, 28, before going inside the school. Once inside, Weise fired randomly down a hallway and in a classroom, killing teacher Neva Wynkoop-Rogers, 62, and students Dewayne Lewis, 15; Chase Lussier, 15; Chanelle Rosebear, 15; Thurlene Stillday, 15; and Alicia White, 14. After engaging in a brief shootout with the police and being injured three times in the lower back, right leg, and right arm, Weise then retreated to another classroom and died by suicide using a shotgun.

The extended Lussier family had been involved for years in trying to help him, and arranged for Weise to have care and psychiatric treatment for depression. Dr. Leslie Lundt, a psychiatrist, has commented that a parent's suicide put individuals at high risk for psychological problems, as does alcohol abuse in the family.

Online activities 
According to reports, Weise spent great amounts of time online on blogging sites. One such blog included a Neo-Nazi Internet forum of the Libertarian National Socialist Green Party. The posts revealed an admiration for the ideas of Adolf Hitler, and interests in persuading other Native Americans as to the merits of those ideas. On one occasion, he fought with a pupil whom he referred to as a "Communist". He also alleged that the school was warned that someone was going to "shoot up" the school on April 20, the birthday of Adolf Hitler and the anniversary of the Columbine High School massacre, and that the school authorities "pinned" the threat on him.

Weise also created violent Flash animations and posted them on the Internet (including the website Newgrounds). He uploaded these animations under the alias "Regret". One animation entitled Target Practice depicts an individual who shoots three people with an assault rifle, blows up a police car with a grenade, then shoots a Ku Klux Klan member. It ends when the character uses a handgun to shoot himself in the head. The animation is accompanied by the sounds of gunfire.

Compensation 
After the murders and Weise's suicide, in April 2005, the Red Lake Band of Chippewa distributed 15 grants to families of victims and people affected by the shootings from a memorial fund that received $200,000 in donations from across the country. They gave $5,000 as a victims-aid grant to Weise's relatives, to help pay for the youth's funeral and burial. Although some people objected, a tribal leader said Weise's relatives had a double burden, since they too had lost a relative, and now had to live with the fact that he had caused it.

References

External links 
 Jeffrey James Weise obituary, Red Lake New News (March 25, 2005)
 Sarah Left, "A neo-nazi 'angel of death'", The Guardian, March 25, 2005 
 Peter Langman, PhD., School Shooters.info, his website to provide discussion, links to resources and data from 10 years of research
 Peter Langman, "Jeffrey Weise: Family Tree", School Shooters
 Peter Langman, "Biographical timeline of Jeffrey James Weise", School Shooters
 David Hanners and Beth Silva (March 24, 2005). "Troubling Internet postings clash with family's view of a happy Weise", Saint Paul Pioneer Press 
 "Jeffrey Weise", Yahoo! Profile (removed by Yahoo! at 14:32 March 25, 2005 [UTC], and was brought back)
 "Regret" "Syko666", Newgrounds Profiles
 "Culture kills in Red Lake tragedy", includes links to numerous articles about Red Lake Shooting, Blue Corn Comics

1988 births
2005 deaths
2005 murders in the United States
21st-century American criminals
American male criminals
American spree killers
Youth suicides
Ojibwe people
American mass murderers
American murderers of children
Male murderers
American neo-Nazis
People from Minneapolis
Crime in Minnesota
Criminals from Minnesota
Deaths by firearm in Minnesota
Suicides by firearm in Minnesota
Murder–suicides in Minnesota
2005 suicides